Elisa Maria Ramos Damião (10 September 1946 – 7 May 2022) was a Portuguese politician. A member of the Socialist Party, she served in the Assembly of the Republic from 1987 to 1998 and in the European Parliament from 1998 to 2004. She died on 7 May 2022 at the age of 75.

References

1946 births
2022 deaths
20th-century Portuguese politicians
21st-century Portuguese politicians
Socialist Party (Portugal) MEPs
MEPs for Portugal 1999–2004
Women members of the Assembly of the Republic (Portugal)
Members of the Assembly of the Republic (Portugal)
Universidade Lusófona alumni
People from Alcobaça, Portugal
20th-century Portuguese women politicians
21st-century Portuguese women politicians